King George V Dock may refer to:
King George V Dock, Glasgow
King George V Dock, Hull
King George V Dock, London

See also:
King George V Graving Dock, Southampton
King George VI Dock, Singapore